West Houston Airport  is a privately owned, public use airport in Harris County, Texas, 15 miles west of Downtown Houston in the Greater Katy area. It opened in 1962 and was known as Lakeside Airport until the early 1980s due to its location near the edge of Addicks reservoir.

The National Plan of Integrated Airport Systems for 2011–2015 categorized it as a general aviation reliever airport. Houston Air Route Traffic Control Center in Houston is the airport's designated ARTCC.

Facilities
West Houston Airport covers 200 acres (81 ha) at an elevation of 111 feet (34 m). Its single runway, 15/33, is 3,953 by 75 feet (1,205 x 23 m) asphalt.

In 2016 the airport had 103,000 aircraft operations, average 282 per day: 68% local general aviation, 31% transient general aviation, and 1% air taxi.

The airport is home to more than 375 aircraft. Being privately owned, the airport does not receive federal funding for improvements. There is a landing fee for fixed-wing aircraft that's usually $10. There is also a US$10 Handling/Security/Facility fee will be invoiced to the aircraft's owner if incoming passengers do not make some sort of purchase to support the airport. The terminal building is a two-story facility containing conference rooms and normal airport facilities.

West Houston Airport was named as one of America's "Most Needed Airports" list by NATA (National Air Transportation Association)

Past scheduled passenger airline service
In the mid 1980s, West Houston Airport was served by Air West (a commuter air carrier not to be confused with Hughes Airwest) with eight nonstop flights every weekday to Dallas Love Field operated with four engine, 50-passenger seat de Havilland Canada DHC-7 Dash 7 turboprops with these aircraft being STOL (short take off and landing) capable which was advantageous in light of the relatively short runway at IWS.

See also

 List of airports in Texas

References

External links

 West Houston Airport
 Aerial image as of January 1995 from USGS The National Map
 
 

Airports in Harris County, Texas
Airports established in 1962